is a leg entanglement throw in Judo that targets an opponent's leg.  It is one of the techniques adopted later by the Kodokan into their Shinmeisho No Waza (newly accepted techniques) list.  It is categorized as a side sacrifice technique, Yoko-sutemi. It is also one of the four forbidden techniques, Kinshi-Waza.

It is also a rarely used kimarite (winning technique) in sumo, where it is allowed.

See also
The Canon Of Judo

References

External links
klnjudo.com

Judo technique
Grappling
Grappling hold
Grappling positions
Martial art techniques